Kiss & Tell is the third studio album by the Swedish rock band Sahara Hotnights.

Media appearances
The song "Hot Night Crash" was featured in the video games Burnout 3: Takedown and Tony Hawk's Downhill Jam.
The song "Walk on the Wire" was featured in the What's New, Scooby-Doo? episode, "A Scooby-Doo Valentine".

Track listing
All songs written by Maria Andersson and Josephine Forsman.
"Who Do You Dance For?" – 2:19
"Hot Night Crash" – 2:41
"Empty Heart" – 2:54
"Walk on the Wire" – 2:54
"Mind over Matter" – 3:17
"Stupid Tricks" – 3:51
"Nerves" – 3:08
"Stay/Stay Away" – 2:58
"Keep Calling My Baby" – 3:29
"The Difference Between Love and Hell" – 4:01
"Hangin'" – 3:19

B-sides

Personnel
Maria Andersson  – lead vocals, guitar
Jennie Asplund  –  guitar, backing vocals
Johanna Asplund  –  bass, backing vocals
Josephine Forsman  – drums

References

Sahara Hotnights albums
2004 albums
RCA Records albums